The 2015 Kor Royal Cup was the 80th Kor Royal Cup, an annual football match contested by the winners of the previous season's Thai Premier League and Thai FA Cup competitions.  The match was played at Suphachalasai Stadium, Bangkok, on 24 January 2015, and contested by 2014 Thai Premier League champions Buriram United, and Bangkok Glass as the winner of the 2014 Thai FA Cup.

Details

Assistant referees:
 Kriengsak Kiatsongkram
 Anuwat Feemuechang
Fourth official:
 Sivakorn Pu-Udom

See also
 2015 Thai Premier League
 2015 Thai Division 1 League
 2015 Regional League Division 2
 2015 Thai FA Cup
 2015 Thai League Cup

External links

2015